This is a list of current and former destinations served by Blue Air as of July 2022 prior to the suspension of all operations:

List

References

NEW ROUTE: Bucharest - Cluj, June 3, 2016

Lists of airline destinations